Kembar is an Indonesian and Malay word meaning twin.

 Mount Kembar
 Danau Kembar - Twin Lake
 Lake Dibawah
 Lake Diatas

Indonesian words and phrases
Malay words and phrases

Kembar is also a name of place near  Padil in Mangalore City, Mangalore Bangalore Highway, Karnataka, India..